Silas Marcus MacVane (Macvane) (June 4, 1842 in Rothwell, Prince Edward Island - January 19, 1914 in Rome) was a Canadian-American historian, the McLean Professor of Ancient and Modern History at Harvard University starting in 1887 after the death of Ephraim Whitman Gurney (1829-1886).  He was a professor at Harvard from 1873 until 1911.

MacVane was born on Prince Edward Island. He received his undergraduate degree from Acadia University in Nova Scotia in 1865.  From 1865 until 1870 he taught at a school in Nova Scotia, then studied at Harvard University in 1871-1873 under Henry Adams, who instilled in him a love for scientific history.   He joined the faculty of Harvard in 1875 in the department of political economy, but transferred to the history department in 1878.

MacVane's main focus of study was modern political history of both the United States and European countries.  He was a frequent contributor to The Quarterly Journal of Economics.  One of his most popular books was Working Principles of Political Economy (1890; 4th ed., 1897).

Both Presidents Roosevelt have been attending History course by Professor MacVane at Harvard

Professor MacVane died in Rome in 1914, shortly before the start of WWI

References

Sources
Joshua Lawrence Chamberlain, John de Witt and John Howard Van Amringe.Universities and Their Sons: History, Influence and Characteristics of American Universities, with Biographical Sketches and Portraits of Alumni and Recipients of Honorary Degrees (R. Herndon Company, 1899), p. 18. 
Jan. 17, 1911 article from Harvard Crimson on MacVane's resignation

1842 births
Canadian emigrants to the United States
American historians
1914 deaths
Harvard University alumni
Harvard University faculty